The Nordic mixed team normal hill/4 × 3.3 km competition at the 2020 Winter Youth  Olympics was held on 22 January at the Les Tuffes Nordic Centre, France and Vallée de Joux Cross-Country Centre.

Results

Ski jumping 
The ski jumping part was held at 10:00.

Cross-country 
The cross-country part was held at 13:30.

References 

Nordic mixed team normal hill/4 × 3.3 km